The archery competitions at the 2017 Southeast Asian Games in Kuala Lumpur took place at National Sports Complex, Malaysia in Kuala Lumpur.

The 2017 Games featured competitions in ten events (men 4 events, women 4 events, and mixed 2 events).

Events
The following events will be contested:

Competition schedule

Participation

Participating nations

Medal summary

Medal table

Recurve

Compound

See also
Archery at the 2017 ASEAN Para Games

References

External links